A national Commission on Money and Credit (CMC) was established November 21, 1957, by Donald K. David, Chairman of the Committee for Economic Development (CED) to make the first extensive investigation of the U.S. monetary system since the Aldrich Commission of 1908–1911. The report of the commission was published in June 1961 and it was subsequently disbanded.

Goals and structure 

The commission was planned to make the first extensive investigation of the U.S. monetary system since the Aldrich Commission of 1908–1911.  The Commission on Money and Credit would evaluate whether the existing structure of the U.S. financial system and the regulations on various financial institutions were adequate to cope with the anticipated future needs of the U.S. economy.

The Commission on Money and Credit was intended to consist of nine to eighteen members drawn from “business, labor, agriculture, and education, and from fields of research and administration”.  Ten prominent individuals in academia, social science research, and economics, would advise Mr. David on the selection of the members of the commission.

Hyman Philip Minsky 

Hyman P. Minsky, Associate Professor of Economics, The University of California, Berkeley, consulted with the commission, for which he co-authored Private Capital Markets; A Series Of Research Studies Prepared For The Commission On Money And Credit in 1964.

President John F. Kennedy's Remarks 

President John F. Kennedy made the following remarks upon receiving the report of The Commission on Money and Credit, in a speech on June 19, 1961, from the Oval Office of the White House, Washington, D.C.:

Footnotes

References 
 Karl Brunner, “The Report of the Commission on Money and Credit”, The Journal of Political Economy, Vol. 69, No. 6, Dec. 1961, pp. 605–620.
 The Commission on Money and Credit.  A Progress Report.  February 1960.  New York, NY, 1960.
 The Commission on Money and Credit.  Money and Credit: Their Influence on Jobs, Prices, and Growth.  The Report of The Commission on Money and Credit.  Englewood Cliffs, NJ, Prentice-Hall, 1961.
 Review of Report of The Commission on Money and Credit.  Hearings Before the Joint Economic Committee, U.S. Congress, Eighty-Seventh Congress, First Session.  Aug. 11-18, 1961.  Washington, DC: U.S. Govt. Printing Office, 1961.
 William G. Dewald, “Commission on Money and Credit Research Studies: A Review Article”, The Journal of Political Economy, Vol. 73, No. 1, Feb. 1965, pp. 83–93.  (https://www.jstor.org/stable/pdfplus/1828433.pdf)  (Professor Hyman P. Minsky is cited on page 93.)
 Frank Popper.  The President’s Commissions.  New York, NY: Twentieth Century Fund, 1970.
 Karl Schriftgiesser.  Notes on the Origin and Establishment of the Commission on Money and Credit.  Unpublished manuscript.

Economy of the United States
United States national commissions
United States economic policy
Financial regulation in the United States
United States federal boards, commissions, and committees
1957 establishments in the United States